Commander, U.S. Pacific Fleet (COMPACFLT), is the title of the United States Navy officer who commands the United States Pacific Fleet (USPACFLT).  Originally established in 1907 as a two-star rear admiral's billet, the position has been held by a four-star admiral since March 19, 1915.

, Admiral Samuel J. Paparo Jr. is the 64th and current Commander, U.S. Pacific Fleet.

History
The position has been known by several titles since its inception.
1907 to December 6, 1922:  Commander-in-Chief, U.S. Pacific Fleet (CINCPACFLT)
December 6, 1922 to April 1, 1931:  Commander-in-Chief, Battle Fleet (CINCBATFLT)
April 1, 1931 to February 1, 1941:  Commander, Battle Force, United States Fleet (COMBATFOR)
February 1, 1941 to October 24, 2002:  Commander-in-Chief, U.S. Pacific Fleet (CINCPACFLT)
October 24, 2002 to present:  Commander, U.S. Pacific Fleet (COMPACFLT)

List of commanders

See also
Commander, U.S. Fleet Forces Command

References

Notes

External links
Official website
U.S. Pacific Fleet Commanders

Commander, U.S. Pacific